The 2016 London Sevens was the tenth and final tournament within the 2015–16 World Rugby Sevens Series. This edition of the London Sevens was held over the weekend of 21–22 May 2016 at Twickenham in London.

Format
The teams were drawn into four pools of four teams each. Each team plays all the others in their pool once. The top two teams from each pool advance to the Cup/Plate brackets. The bottom two teams go into the Bowl/Shield brackets.

Teams
The pools and schedule were announced in April 2016.

Pool Stage

Pool A

Pool B

Pool C

Pool D

Knockout stage

Shield

Bowl

Plate

Cup

External links
Official Site

London Sevens
London
London Sevens